Robert Martin Douglas (January 28, 1849 – February 8, 1917) was a North Carolina Supreme Court justice and political figure. At the beginning of his career, the young attorney served as private secretary to the Republican governor of North Carolina, and secretary to President Ulysses S. Grant.

Early life and education
Born on January 28, 1849, at his maternal grandmother's home in Rockingham County, North Carolina, he was the first of two sons of Senator Stephen A. Douglas (Democrat of Illinois) and Martha Martin, originally of North Carolina.  Martha died after the birth of her third child, a daughter, in 1853, and the unnamed infant died a few weeks later.  Robert was only four. He and his brother Stephen spent considerable time when young with their maternal grandmother and the Martin family in their mother's home state. After his father married Adele Cutts, from a Maryland Catholic family, she had the boys baptized and reared them as Catholic with his permission.

The family split their time between homes in Washington, DC and Chicago, Illinois during his father's Senate service.  Douglas attended Loyola College in Baltimore, Maryland, and graduated from Georgetown College in Washington, DC in 1867. He later earned a Master's degree and a doctoral degree in law from the same institution.

Career
In the aftermath of the American Civil War, Douglas turned away from the Democratic Party to which his father had belonged. He believed that the party had died during the war.  he became a leading Republican and active in Reconstruction era governments. During 1868, Douglas served as private secretary to the Governor of North Carolina.  From 1869 to 1873, he was appointed private secretary to President Ulysses S. Grant.

For the next decade, he served as United States Marshal for North Carolina.  In 1888 he was appointed to serve as Master in Chancery to the United States Circuit Court. He continued until 1896, when he was elected as associate justice of the North Carolina Supreme Court.

In 1901, Justice Douglas and Chief Justice David M. Furches (also a Republican) were impeached by the Democratic Party-controlled North Carolina House of Representatives "for issuing an allegedly unconstitutional mandamus ordering the State Treasurer to pay out money."  Neither was removed from office by the necessary two-thirds vote of the North Carolina Senate, although a simple majority of senators favored removal. Douglas served his eight-year term and then retired from the court. A principal contributor to the building of St. Agnes Church in Greensboro, Douglas authored the article on "North Carolina" for the Catholic Encyclopedia.

Douglas died at his home in Greensboro, North Carolina, on February 8, 1917.

Marriage and family
On June 23, 1874, Douglas married Jessie Madeline Dick, daughter of the Honorable Robert Paine Dick, a Supreme Court justice of North Carolina. They had four children together:
 
Madeleine Douglas (who later married Col. Edward Warren Myers)
Robert Dick Douglas (1875–1960)
Stephen Arnold Douglas (born 1879)
Martin F. Douglas (born 1886)

References

1849 births
1917 deaths
Georgetown College (Georgetown University) alumni
North Carolina Republicans
United States Marshals
Justices of the North Carolina Supreme Court
Georgetown University Law Center alumni
Contributors to the Catholic Encyclopedia
19th-century American judges
19th-century American lawyers
United States judges impeached by state or territorial governments